Richard Keith Williams (born August 13, 1960) is a former American football running back in the National Football League. He was drafted by the Washington Redskins in the 1983 NFL Draft and played for the Atlanta Falcons and Houston Oilers. He played college football at Memphis.

References

1960 births
Living people
American football running backs
Houston Oilers players
Atlanta Falcons players
Memphis Tigers football players
Players of American football from Florida
People from Eustis, Florida
Sportspeople from Lake County, Florida